Szymon Piotr Żurkowski (born 25 September 1997) is a Polish professional footballer who plays as a midfielder for Italian  club Spezia on loan from Fiorentina. He represents the Poland national team.

Club career
Żurkowski started his career with Gwarek Zabrze.

In 2016 Żurkowski signed for Górnik Zabrze.

On 28 January 2019, Żurkowski signed for Fiorentina a contract until 30 June 2023. He stayed at Górnik Zabrze on loan for the remainder of the 2018–19 season.

On 30 January 2020, he joined Empoli on loan. On 1 September 2020, he return on loan to Empoli until 30 June 2021.

On 12 January 2023, Żurkowski joined Spezia on loan, with an obligation to buy.

International career

Under 21 team
During the 2019 UEFA European Under-21 Championship qualification, from September 2017 to March 2018, Żurkowski played five of the Polish U21's six group games, scoring one goal. Poland sit top of Group 3 with four games to follow.

Senior team
In May 2018, Żurkowski was named in the 35-man provisional squad for Poland for the 2018 FIFA World Cup, however, was not included in the 23-man squad.

Żurkowski debuted on 24 March 2022 for Poland in a friendly match as a starter against Scotland.

Career statistics

Club

References

External links
 
 

1997 births
Living people
People from Tychy
Polish footballers
Association football midfielders
Poland international footballers
Poland under-21 international footballers
Ekstraklasa players
Serie A players
Serie B players
Gwarek Zabrze players
Górnik Zabrze players
ACF Fiorentina players
Empoli F.C. players
Spezia Calcio players
2022 FIFA World Cup players
Polish expatriate footballers
Polish expatriate sportspeople in Italy
Expatriate footballers in Italy